Romeosaurus is an extinct genus of yaguarasaurine mosasaur known from the early Late Cretaceous "Lastame" lithotype (lower Turonian to lower Santonian) of northern Italy. It contains two species, Romeosaurus sorbinii and Romeosaurus fumanensis.  Of the two species, R. sorbinii is known only through very fragmented fossil records of a single specimen and is otherwise poorly described.  R. fumanensis is known through more specimens found across a small geographic area in Italy.  The genus is named after the character Romeo in Shakespeare's Romeo and Juliet. Of all specimens recovered, none had well enough preserved post-cranial fossils to make good judgments of their post-cranial anatomy.

References

Fossils of Italy
Russellosaurins
Mosasaurs of Europe
Fossil taxa described in 2013